Vice Senior General Maung Aye (born 25 December 1937) is a Burmese military official who was Vice Chairman of the State Peace and Development Council (SPDC), the ruling military junta of Myanmar, from July 1993 to March 2011. Maung Aye was the second highest-ranking member of the SPDC.

Career
Maung Aye graduated from the Defence Services Academy in Pyin U Lwin with a Bachelor of Science degree in 1960. In 1968, he became commander of the Northeast Region. In 1988, he became commander of the Eastern Region. Two years later he was promoted to major-general. In 1992, he was made Army Chief. In 1993, he was named Lieutenant General and the Deputy Commander in Chief of Defense Services. In 1994, he was appointed Deputy Chairman of SLORC, and subsequently held the same position in the SPDC.

Vice Senior General Maung Aye and Senior General Than Shwe, along with six other top military officers, were reported to have resigned their military posts on 27 August 2010. He reportedly transferred the deputy commander-in-chief post to Lt-Gen Ko Ko, head of Chief of Bureau of Special Operation-3, but remains the country's deputy head of state. The rumours were later proven false. However, on 30 March 2011, the SPDC was dissolved by Than Shwe in favour of the elected President Thein Sein, which meant that Maung Aye's post also ceased to exist.

Personal
He is married to Mya Mya San and has one daughter, Nandar Aye. Nandar Aye is married to Pyi Aung (also spelt Pye Aung), the son of Aung Thaung, a former government minister and Pyithu Hluttaw representative.

References

 
 

1937 births
Living people
People from Yangon Region
Burmese military personnel
Defence Services Academy alumni
Burmese generals